B6 often refers to:

 Vitamin B6

B6 may also refer to:

Transportation

Automobiles
 A generation of Audi A4, manufactured from 2001 to 2005
 A fully armoured version of the Bentley Arnage Series Two RL
 A member of the Mazda B engine series

Aircraft
Blackburn B.6 Shark, a British 1930s torpedo bomber
Keystone B-6, a United States Army Air Corps bomber
Lohner B.VI, an Austro-Hungarian World War 1 reconnaissance biplane
Nakajima B-6, Nakajima designation for Bréguet 14 built under licence in Japan 
Republic B 6, Swedish designation for Republic 2PA fighter

Other vehicles
 B6 (New York City bus), serving Brooklyn
 Bavarian B VI, an 1863 German steam locomotive model
 , a submarine of the Royal Navy
 , a submarine of Norway
 LNER Class B6, a class of British steam locomotives

Roads
 B6 road (Cyprus), a road on the island of Cyprus
 B6 (Zimbabwe), a road in Zimbabwe
 Bundesstraße 6, a national highway in Germany

Life sciences
 Vitamin B6, a water-soluble compound pyridoxine which takes several forms
 ATC code B06 Other hematological agents, a subgroup of the Anatomical Therapeutic Chemical Classification System
 C57BL/6, an inbred mouse strain

Other uses
 B6 (musician), a Chinese DJ and music producer 
JetBlue Airways (IATA code B6)
 Bensen B-6, a small rotor kite from 1953
 Pilcrow (¶) character, Url encoded version %B6
 Proanthocyanidin B6, a B type proanthocyanidin
 An international standard paper size (125×176 mm), defined in ISO 216
 6 amp, type B – a standard circuit breaker current rating, commonly used to protect domestic lighting rings
 B6, Villa Park, referring to UK post code for Aston, Birmingham

See also
 6B (disambiguation)
 B60 (disambiguation)
 BVI (disambiguation)